The Grès de Labarre is a geological formation in France whose strata date back to the Late Cretaceous. Dinosaur remains are among the fossils that have been recovered from the formation.

Fossil content 
Indeterminate nodosaurid remains present in Département de L'Ariege, France.

See also 
 List of dinosaur-bearing rock formations

References 

Geologic formations of France
Upper Cretaceous Series of Europe
Cretaceous France
Maastrichtian Stage
Sandstone formations
Paleontology in France